The Ottawa Senators, officially the Ottawa Senators Hockey Club and colloquially known as the Sens, are a professional ice hockey team based in Ottawa. They compete in the National Hockey League (NHL) as a member of the Atlantic Division in the Eastern Conference, and play their home games at the 18,652-seat Canadian Tire Centre, which opened in 1996 as the Palladium.

Founded and established by Ottawa real estate developer Bruce Firestone, the team is the second NHL franchise to use the Ottawa Senators name. The original Ottawa Senators, founded in 1883, had a famed history, winning the Stanley Cup 11 times, playing in the NHL from 1917 until 1934. On December 6, 1990, after a two-year public campaign by Firestone, the NHL awarded a new franchise, which began play in the 1992–93 season. The Senators have made 16 playoff appearances, won four division titles, and won the 2003 Presidents' Trophy. They made an appearance in the 2007 Stanley Cup Finals, but lost to the Anaheim Ducks in five games.

History

Ottawa had been home to the original Senators, a founding NHL franchise and 11-time Stanley Cup champions. After the NHL expanded to the United States in the late 1920s, the original Senators' eventual financial losses forced the franchise to move to St. Louis in 1934 operating as the Eagles while a Senators senior amateur team took over the Senators' place in Ottawa. The NHL team was unsuccessful in St. Louis and planned to return to Ottawa, but the NHL decided instead to suspend the franchise and transfer the players to other NHL teams.

Fifty-four years later, after the NHL announced plans to expand, Ottawa real estate developer Bruce Firestone decided along with colleagues Cyril Leeder and Randy Sexton that Ottawa was now able to support an NHL franchise, and the group proceeded to put a bid together. His firm, Terrace Investments, did not have the liquid assets to finance the expansion fee and the team, but the group conceived a strategy to leverage land development. In 1989, after finding a suitable site on farmland just west of Ottawa in Kanata on which to construct a new arena, Terrace announced its intention to win a franchise and launched a successful "Bring Back the Senators" campaign to both woo the public and persuade the NHL that the city could support an NHL franchise. Public support was high and the group would secure over 11,000 season ticket pledges. On December 12, 1990, the NHL approved a new franchise for Firestone's group, to start play in the 1992–93 season.

Early years (1992–1996)
The new team hired former NHL player Mel Bridgman, who had no previous NHL management experience, as its first general manager in 1992. The team was initially interested in hiring former Jack Adams Award winner Brian Sutter as its first head coach, but Sutter came with a high price tag and was reluctant to be a part of an expansion team. When Sutter was eventually signed to coach the Boston Bruins, Ottawa signed Rick Bowness, the man Sutter replaced in Boston. The new Senators were placed in the Adams Division of the Wales Conference and played their first game on October 8, 1992, in the Ottawa Civic Centre against the Montreal Canadiens with much pre-game spectacle. The Senators defeated the Canadiens 5–3 in one of the few highlights that season. Following the initial excitement of the opening night victory, the club floundered badly and eventually tied the San Jose Sharks for the worst record in the league, winning only 10 games with 70 losses and four ties for 24 points, three points better than the NHL record for futility. The Senators had aimed low and considered the 1992–93 season a small success, as Firestone had set a goal for the season of not setting a new NHL record for fewest points in a season. The long-term plan was to finish low in the standings for its first few years in order to secure high draft picks and eventually contend for the Stanley Cup.

Off-ice, Terrace needed a partner to make the final franchise payment to the NHL. Firestone sold 50% of Terrace to Rod Bryden, a technology executive and entrepreneur. A limited partnership was set up to own the hockey team and a new company, Palladium Corp., which was charged with building the new arena. The partnership included local high-tech executives and singer Paul Anka, who was born in Ottawa. Bryden would become the sole owner of Terrace and majority owner of the Senators in August 1993, buying out Firestone.

Bridgman was fired after one season and Team President Randy Sexton took over the general manager duties. The strategy of aiming low and securing a high draft position did not change. The Senators finished last overall for the next three seasons. For the 1993–94 season, the team now played in the Eastern Conference's Northeast Division. Although 1993 first overall draft choice Alexandre Daigle wound up being one of the greatest draft busts in NHL history, they chose Radek Bonk in 1994, Bryan Berard (traded for Wade Redden) in 1995, Chris Phillips in 1996 and Marian Hossa in 1997, all of whom would become solid NHL players and formed a strong core of players in years to come. Alexei Yashin, the team's first-ever draft selection from 1992, emerged as one of the NHL's brightest young stars. The team traded many of their better veteran players of the era, including 1992–93 leading scorer Norm Maciver and fan favourites Mike Peluso and Bob Kudelski in an effort to stockpile prospects and draft picks.

As the 1995–96 season began, star centre Alexei Yashin refused to honour his contract and did not play. In December, after three straight last-place finishes and a team which was ridiculed throughout the league, fans began to grow restless waiting for the team's long-term plan to yield results, and arena attendance began to decline. Rick Bowness was fired in late 1995 and was replaced by the Prince Edward Island Senators' head coach Dave Allison. Allison would fare no better than his predecessor, and the team would stumble to a 2–22–3 record under him. Sexton himself was fired and replaced by Pierre Gauthier, the former assistant GM of the Mighty Ducks of Anaheim team. Before the end of January 1996, Gauthier had resolved the team's most pressing issues by settling star player Alexei Yashin's contract dispute, and hiring the highly regarded Jacques Martin as head coach. While Ottawa finished last-overall once again, the season ended with renewed optimism, due in part to the upgraded management and coaching, and also to the emergence of an unheralded rookie from Sweden named Daniel Alfredsson, who would win the Calder Memorial Trophy as NHL Rookie of the Year in 1996.

Jacques Martin era (1996–2004)

Martin would impose a "strong defence first" philosophy that led to the team qualifying for the playoffs every season that he coached, but he was criticized for the team's lack of success in the playoffs, notably losing four straight series against the provincial rival Toronto Maple Leafs.

In 1996–97, his first season, the club qualified for the playoffs in the last game of the season and nearly defeated the Buffalo Sabres in the first round. In 1997–98, the club finished with their first winning record and upset the heavily favoured New Jersey Devils to win their first playoff series. In 1998–99, the Senators jumped from fourteenth overall in the previous season to third, with 103 points—the first 100-point season in club history, only to be swept in the first round by the Sabres. In 1999–2000 despite the holdout of team captain Alexei Yashin, Martin guided the team to the playoffs, only to lose to the Maple Leafs in the first Battle of Ontario series. Yashin returned for 2000–01 and the team improved to win their division and place second in the Eastern Conference. Yashin played poorly in another first-round playoff loss and on the day of the 2001 NHL Entry Draft, he was traded to the New York Islanders in exchange for Zdeno Chara, Bill Muckalt and the second overall selection in the draft, which Ottawa used to select centre Jason Spezza.

In 2000, owner Bryden publicly appealed for tax relief from the Government of Canada for all Canadian NHL teams, coping with a large drop in the Canadian dollar. His appeal was first met with a plan for tax relief, but the tax relief program was cancelled. Bryden then announced the sale of the club outright to a limited partnership in 2002 for  million, which would include creditors and Bryden himself. The Senators entered bankruptcy protection in January 2003, owing  million for the club and  million for the arena. The deal fell through in 2003 when American investor Nelson Peltz declined to get involved. In August 2003, pharmaceutical billionaire Eugene Melnyk would purchase the club to bring financial stability for a reported   million.

The 2001–02 Senators regular-season points total dropped, but in the playoffs, they upset the Philadelphia Flyers for the franchise's second playoff series win. The Sens would go on to push their second-round series to seven games, but they were ultimately once again defeated by the Maple Leafs. Despite speculation that Martin would be fired, it was GM Marshall Johnston who left, retiring from the team. He was replaced by John Muckler, the Senators' first with previous management experience.

Although the Senators were bankrupt, they continued to play in the 2002–03 season after getting emergency financing. Despite the off-ice problems, Ottawa had an outstanding season, placing first overall in the NHL to win the Presidents' Trophy. In the playoffs, they came within one game of making it into the Finals, losing to the eventual Stanley Cup champion New Jersey Devils. In 2003–04, Martin would guide the team to another good regular season but again would lose in the first round of the playoffs to the Maple Leafs, leading to Martin's dismissal as management felt that a new coach was required for playoff success.

Bryan Murray era (2004–2016)
After the playoff loss, owner Melnyk promised that changes were coming and they came quickly. In June 2004, Anaheim Ducks GM Bryan Murray of nearby Shawville, became the head coach. That summer, the team also made substantial personnel changes, trading long-time players Patrick Lalime and Radek Bonk, and signing free agent goaltender Dominik Hasek. The team would not be able to show its new line-up for a year, as the 2004–05 NHL lock-out intervened and most players played in Europe or in the minors. In a final change, just before the 2005–06 season, the team traded long-time player Marian Hossa for Dany Heatley.

The media predicted the Senators to be Stanley Cup contenders in 2005–06, as they had a strong core of players returning, played an up-tempo style fitting the new rule changes and Hasek was expected to provide top-notch goaltending. The team rushed out of the gate, winning 19 of the first 22 games, in the end winning 52 games and 113 points, placing first in the conference, and second overall. The newly formed 'CASH' line of Alfredsson, Spezza and newly acquired Dany Heatley established itself as one of the league's top offensive lines. Hasek played well until he was injured during the 2006 Winter Olympics, forcing the team to enter the playoffs with rookie netminder Ray Emery as their starter. Without Hasek, the club bowed out in a second-round loss to the Buffalo Sabres.

In 2006–07, the Senators reached the Stanley Cup Finals after qualifying for the playoffs in nine consecutive seasons. The Senators had a high turn-over of personnel and the disappointment of 2006 to overcome and started the season poorly. Trade rumours swirled around Daniel Alfredsson for most of the last months of 2006. The team lifted itself out of last place in the division to nearly catch the Buffalo Sabres by season's end, placing fourth in the Eastern Conference. The team finished with 105 points, their fourth consecutive 100-point season and sixth in the last eight. In the playoffs, Ottawa continued its good play. Led by the 'CASH' line, goaltender Ray Emery, and the strong defence of Chris Phillips and Anton Volchenkov, the club defeated the Pittsburgh Penguins, the second-ranked New Jersey Devils and the top-ranked Sabres to advance to the Stanley Cup Finals.

The 2006–07 Senators thus became the first Ottawa team to be in a Stanley Cup Final since 1927 and the city was swept up in the excitement. Businesses along all of the main streets posted large hand-drawn "Go Sens Go" signs, residents put up large displays in front of their homes or decorated their cars. A large Ottawa Senators flag was draped on the City Hall, along with a large video screen showing the games. A six-storey likeness of Daniel Alfredsson was hung on the Corel building. Rallies were held outside of City Hall, car rallies of decorated cars paraded through town and a section of downtown, dubbed the "Sens Mile", was closed off to traffic during and after games for fans to congregate.

In the Final, the Senators faced the Anaheim Ducks, considered a favourite since the start of the season, a team the Senators had last played in 2006, and a team known for its strong defence. The Ducks won the first two games in Anaheim 3–2 and 1–0. Returning home, the Senators won game three 5–3, but lost game four 3–2. The Ducks won game five 6–2 in Anaheim to clinch the series and their first Stanley Cup championship. The Ducks had played outstanding defence, shutting down the 'CASH' line, forcing Murray to split up the line. The Ducks scored timely goals and Ducks' goaltender Jean-Sebastien Giguere out-played Emery.

In the off-season after the Stanley Cup Finals, Bryan Murray's contract was expiring, while General Manager (GM) John Muckler had one season remaining, at which he was expected to retire. Murray, who had previously been a GM for other NHL clubs, was expected to take over the GM position, although no public timetable was given. Owner Melnyk decided to offer Muckler another position in the organization and give the GM position to Murray. Muckler declined the offer and was relieved from his position. Melnyk publicly justified the move, saying that he expected to lose Murray if his contract ran out. Murray then elevated John Paddock, the assistant coach, to head coach of the Senators. Under Paddock, the team came out to a record start to the 2007–08 season. However, team play declined to a .500 level and the team looked to be falling out of the playoffs. Paddock was fired by Murray, who took over coaching on an interim basis. The club managed to qualify for the playoffs by a tie-breaker but was swept in the first round of the playoffs by the Pittsburgh Penguins. In June, the club bought-out goaltender Ray Emery, who had become notorious for off-ice events in Ottawa and lateness to several team practices.

For 2008–09, Murray hired Craig Hartsburg to coach the Senators. Under Hartsburg's style, the Senators struggled and played under .500. Uneven goaltending with Martin Gerber and Alex Auld meant the team played cautiously to protect the goaltender. Murray's patience ran out in February 2009, with the team well out of playoff contention and Hartsburg was fired, although he had two years left on his contract, and the team also had Paddock under contract. Cory Clouston was elevated from the Binghamton coaching position. The team played above .500 under Clouston and rookie goaltender Brian Elliott, who had been promoted from Binghamton. Gerber was waived from the team at the trading deadline and the team traded for goaltender Pascal Leclaire, although he would not play due to injury. The team failed to make the playoffs for the first time in 12 seasons. Auld would be traded in the off-season to make room. Clouston's coaching had caused a rift with top player Dany Heatley (although unspecified "personal issues" were also noted by Heatley) and after Clouston was given a contract to continue coaching, Heatley made a trade demand and was traded just before the start of the 2009–10 season.

In 2009–10, the Senators were a .500 team, until going on a team-record 11-game winning streak in January. The streak propelled the team to the top of the Northeast Division standings and a top-three placing for the playoffs. The team was unable to hold off the Sabres for the division lead but qualified for the playoffs in the fifth position. For the third season in four, the Senators played off against the Pittsburgh Penguins in the first round. A highlight for the Senators was winning a triple-overtime fifth game in Pittsburgh, but the team was unable to win a playoff game on home ice, losing the series in six games.

The Senators had a much poorer than expected 2010–11 campaign, resulting in constant rumours of a shakeup right through until December. The rumours were heightened in January after the team went on a lengthy losing streak. January was a dismal month for the Senators, winning only one game all month. Media speculated on the imminent firing of Clouston, Murray or both. Owner Melynk cleared the air in an article in the edition of January 22, 2011, of the Ottawa Sun. Melnyk stated that he would not fire either Clouston or Murray, but that he had given up on this season and was in the process of developing a plan for the future. On Monday, January 24, The Globe and Mail reported that the plan included hiring a new general manager before the June entry draft and that Murray would be retained as an advisor to the team. A decision on whether to retain Clouston would be made by the new general manager. The article by Roy MacGregor, a long-time reporter of the Ottawa Senators, stated that former assistant coach Pierre McGuire had already been interviewed. Murray, in a press conference that day, stated that he wished to stay on as the team's general manager. He also stated that Melnyk was allowing him to continue as the general manager without restraint. Murray said that the players were now to be judged by their play until the February 28 trade deadline. Murray would attempt to move "a couple, at least" of the players for draft picks or prospects at that time if the Senators remained out of playoff contention.

True to his word, Murray made a flurry of trades. He started his overhaul with the trading of Mike Fisher to the Nashville Predators. Fisher already had a home in Nashville with his wife Carrie Underwood. The trading of Fisher, a fan favourite in Ottawa, led to a small anti-Underwood backlash with the banning of her songs from the playlists of some local radio stations. Murray next traded veterans Chris Kelly, and Jarkko Ruutu. A swap of goaltenders was made with the Colorado Avalanche which brought Craig Anderson to Ottawa in exchange for Brian Elliott, both goalies having sub-par years. Next, under-achieving forward Alex Kovalev was traded to the Pittsburgh Penguins. On trade deadline day, Ottawa picked up goaltender Curtis McElhinney on waivers and traded Chris Campoli with a seventh-round pick to the Chicago Blackhawks for a second-round pick and Ryan Potulny. Goaltender Anderson played very well down the stretch for Ottawa, and the team quickly signed the soon-to-be unrestricted free agent to a four-year contract. After media speculation on the future of Murray within the organization, Murray was re-signed as general manager on April 8 to a three-year extension. On April 9, Head coach Cory Clouston and assistants Greg Carvel and Brad Lauer were dismissed from their positions. Murray said that the decision was made based on the fact that the team entered the season believing it was a contender, but finished with a 32–40–10 record. Former Detroit Red Wings' assistant coach Paul MacLean was hired as Clouston's replacement on June 14, 2011.

As the 2011–12 season began, many hockey writers and commentators were convinced that the Senators would finish at or near the bottom of the NHL standings. In the midst of rebuilding, the Ottawa line-up contained many rookies and inexperienced players. The team struggled out of the gate, losing five of their first six games before a reversal of fortunes saw them win six games in a row. In December 2011, the team acquired forward Kyle Turris from the Phoenix Coyotes in exchange for highly-regarded prospect David Rundblad and a draft pick. The team improved its play afterwards and moved into a playoff position before the All-Star Game. For the first time in Senators' history, the All-Star Game was held in Ottawa, and it was considered a great success. Five Senators were voted in or named to the event, including Daniel Alfredsson, who was named the captain of one team. The team continued its playoff push after the break. After starting goalie Craig Anderson injured his hand in a kitchen accident at home, the Senators called up Robin Lehner from Binghamton and acquired highly-regarded goaltender Ben Bishop from the St. Louis Blues. While Anderson recovered, the team continued its solid play and finished as the eighth seed in the Eastern Conference, drawing a first-round playoff matchup against the Conference champion New York Rangers. Ultimately, Ottawa lost the series in seven games.

The next season, Ottawa would be challenged to repeat the success they had in 2011–12, due to long-term injuries to key players such as Erik Karlsson, Jason Spezza, Milan Michalek and Craig Anderson. Despite these injuries, the Senators would finish seventh in the Eastern Conference and head coach Paul MacLean would go on to win the Jack Adams Award as the NHL's coach of the year. In a rivalry series, Ottawa defeated the second-seeded Montreal Canadiens in the first round of the playoffs in five games, blowing out Montreal 6–1 in games three and five. This was the first Montreal-Ottawa playoff series since Ottawa joined the league and the first between the cities' teams since the original Senators played the Canadiens in 1927. The Senators could not repeat the upset, losing to the top-seeded Pittsburgh Penguins in five games in the second round.

July 5, 2013, would be a day of mixed emotions for the city and fans, as long-time captain Daniel Alfredsson signed a one-year contract with the Detroit Red Wings, leaving Ottawa after 17 seasons with the Senators and 14 as captain after a contract dispute. The signing shocked numerous fans across the city and many within the Senators organization. The day finished optimistically, however, as Murray acquired star forward Bobby Ryan from the Anaheim Ducks, hoping Ryan could replace Alfredsson on the top line with Jason Spezza. Murray would also sign free-agent forward Clarke MacArthur to a two-year contract that same day and bring back former defenceman Joe Corvo to a one-year contract three days later on July 8, 2013.

For the 2013–14 season, the league realigned and Ottawa was assigned to the new Atlantic Division along with the rest of the old Northeast Division and the Detroit Red Wings, formerly of the Western Conference. The re-alignment brought increased competition to qualify for the playoffs, as there were now 16 teams in the Eastern Conference fighting for eight playoff spots. The season began with a changing of leadership, as on September 14, 2013, the Ottawa Senators named Jason Spezza their eighth captain in franchise history. While new addition Clarke MacArthur had a career year, Ryan and Spezza struggled to find chemistry, and Ryan was moved to a line with MacArthur and Kyle Turris. Corvo lost his place in the line-up and was waived. The team outside of a playoff position, Murray bolstered the club with a trade for flashy right-winger Ales Hemsky from the Edmonton Oilers. The club, however, was eliminated from playoff contention in the last week of the season, finishing five points short. Further disappointment ensued as the team lost Hemsky to free agency and Spezza requested a trade out of Ottawa, ending the era of the stars of the 2007 Stanley Cup Final team. Spezza agreed to be traded to the Dallas Stars and was sent with Ludwig Karlsson, for Alex Chiasson, Nick Paul, Alex Guptill and a 2015 second-round pick.

At the beginning of the 2014–15 season, Karlsson was named the franchise's ninth captain and the club signed Ryan to a seven-year extension. Unhappy with an 11–11–5 record after 27 games, the Senators fired head coach Paul MacLean and replaced him with assistant coach Dave Cameron. The change turned the season around for the Senators, who won 32 of their last 55 games. Goaltender Andrew Hammond, aka 'The Hamburglar', would compile a record of 20–1–2, a goals-against average of 1.79, and a save percentage of .941 to get the team back into playoff position. The Senators became the first team in modern NHL history to overcome a 14-point deficit at any juncture of the season to qualify for the playoffs. However, the Senators lost to the Canadiens in six games in the first round of the playoffs.

During the 2014–15 season, it was announced that Murray had cancer. Taking regular treatment, Murray chose to stay on as GM through the 2015–16 season. Despite posting the best record of any Canadian team in the league, the Senators failed to make the playoffs in what was considered a disappointing season (all seven Canadian teams missed the playoffs). Murray made one 'blockbuster' nine-player trade that brought Toronto Maple Leafs' captain Dion Phaneuf to the Senators before the trade deadline. The Senators were outside of a playoff position at the time of the deal, and played well until the end of the season, but fell just short, placing fifth in the division.

Pierre Dorion era (2016–present)
On April 10, 2016, the day after the final game of the 2015–16 season, Murray announced his resignation as general manager and that he would continue in an advisory role with the club. Assistant general manager Pierre Dorion was promoted to the general manager position. On April 12, 2016, the Senators fired head coach Dave Cameron. On May 8, 2016, the Senators hired former Tampa Bay Lightning head coach Guy Boucher as their new head coach. On the following day, Marc Crawford was announced as associate coach. On June 13, 2016, the Senators hired Daniel Alfredsson as the senior advisor of hockey operations. In June 2016, the Senators hired Rob Cookson as an assistant coach, who had worked with both Boucher and Crawford in Switzerland, and Pierre Groulx as a goaltending coach.

The Senators finished second in the Atlantic Division during the 2016–17 season and faced the Boston Bruins in the first round of the playoffs, winning that series in six games. In the second round, they defeated the New York Rangers in six games. During the second game of that series, Jean-Gabriel Pageau scored four goals, including the game-winning goal in double overtime. The Senators would come within one game of the Stanley Cup Finals, but lost in double overtime of the seventh game of their Eastern Conference Final series against the Pittsburgh Penguins, who went on to win their second consecutive Stanley Cup.

Following their appearance in the Eastern Conference Final the previous season, the Senators lost defenceman Marc Methot to the 2017 NHL Expansion Draft. On November 5, 2017, the Senators conducted a blockbuster trade with the Colorado Avalanche, bringing in star-forward Matt Duchene from the Avalanche in exchange for Kyle Turris, Shane Bowers, Andrew Hammond, a conditional first-round pick in 2018 or 2019 and a third-round pick in 2019. Following the trade, however, the Senators' season began to fall apart with a disastrous November road trip. A season highlight was hosting the NHL 100 Classic game outdoors at the TD Place Stadium football field versus the Montreal Canadiens. The game marked the centennial of the first Montreal-Ottawa game in the NHL. The Senators won the game 3–0, but the festival atmosphere was somewhat marred by owner Melnyk's controversial comments to the press about attendance levels and selling or moving the team. Out of the playoff picture, the Senators chose to trade away veteran players. Forward Derick Brassard and defenceman Dion Phaneuf were dealt at the trade deadline to the Pittsburgh Penguins and Los Angeles Kings, respectively. The Senators finished the year second-to-last in the league with a 28–43–11 record and 67 points, their fourth-worst season since entering the league.

During the 2018 off-season, the Senators began what would end up being a complete rebuild. They traded forward Mike Hoffman to the San Jose Sharks, who later that day flipped him to the Florida Panthers. The Senators ended up with the fourth-overall pick in the 2018 NHL Entry Draft as a result of their poor record. Under the conditions of the Matt Duchene trade, they either had to give up the pick to the Avalanche or wait a year and surrender their 2019 first-round pick instead. The Senators elected to keep the pick and selected forward Brady Tkachuk fourth overall. Just before the regular season started, the Senators traded their captain Erik Karlsson to the San Jose Sharks for a large package of players and draft picks.

After a miserable start to the 2018–19 season, the Senators were unable to re-sign star forwards Matt Duchene, Mark Stone and Ryan Dzingel before the trade deadline. In an attempt to create optimism, owner Melnyk famously stated: "The Senators will be all-in again for a five-year run of unparalleled success–where the team will plan to spend close to the NHL's salary cap every year from 2021 to 2025. The Senators' current rebuild is a blueprint on how to bring the Stanley Cup home to its rightful place in Ottawa." All three players were subsequently traded prior to the 2019 trade deadline. Duchene and Dzingel were traded to the Columbus Blue Jackets in exchange for draft picks, prospects and Anthony Duclair while fan favourite Mark Stone was traded to the Vegas Golden Knights in exchange for prospect Erik Brannstrom and a second-round pick. Just days after trading away the team's three leading scorers, it was announced that the plans for a new downtown arena on the open land at Lebreton Flats had fallen through. The Ottawa Citizen called it "one of the gloomiest weeks in the history of the Ottawa Senators."  The 2018–19 season saw the team finish last in the NHL without their own first-round draft pick. This marked the first time since 1995–96 that the Senators missed back-to-back playoff appearances.

Prior to the 2019–20 season, D.J. Smith was hired as the new head coach while the organization shifted its focus to developing its young players. The season was ultimately cut short due to the COVID-19 pandemic and the Senators finished second last in the NHL with 62 points in 71 games. In contrast, Ottawa's farm team the Belleville Senators put together a very impressive, albeit-shortened season led by Ottawa's top prospects which included Josh Norris, Drake Batherson, Alex Formenton and Erik Brannstrom among others. Meanwhile, the San Jose Sharks suffered an unexpected collapse that year which significantly benefited the Senators who had acquired their first-round draft pick in the Erik Karlsson trade. Ottawa found themselves with the third and fifth picks in the 2020 NHL draft and used them to select highly touted prospects Tim Stuetzle and Jake Sanderson.

The Senators would miss the playoffs again for the 2020–21 season, a season overshadowed by the COVID-19 pandemic. The young team played an all-Canadian shortened season, during which they had a poor record to start the season but finished the season with a strong stretch of play, inspiring some optimism for the future. The Senators again traded away veterans at the trade deadline for draft picks.

Before the 2021–22 season, general manager Pierre Dorion's contract was extended until 2025. He proceeded to declare: "The rebuild is done. Now we're stepping into another zone." His claims however did not materialize as the Senators got off to a slow start and were quickly out of the playoff picture. On October 17, 2021, Brady Tkachuk signed a seven-year deal after a dramatic contract holdout. Just under three weeks later, he was named the tenth captain in franchise history at just 22 years of age. Tkachuk was at the time the franchise's youngest-ever captain.

Ahead of the 2022–23 season, the team was aggressive in their efforts to exit their rebuild, drastically retooling the team through the acquisitions of forwards Alex DeBrincat and Claude Giroux and goaltender Cam Talbot. In addition, the team signed Josh Norris and Tim Stuetzle to eight-year contract extensions.

Death of owner Eugene Melnyk and sale
Owner Eugene Melnyk died in March 2022 due to an unspecified illness. In statements in recent years, Melnyk had said that he planned to leave the team to his two daughters Olivia and Anna when he had been asked if he intended to sell the team, although there had been speculation about ownership changes. The team added an 'EM' patch on the jersey for the rest of the season. In November 2022, the team engaged a New York City investment banker to facilitate a sale of the team.  The Senators confirmed the planned sale in a press release on November 5, with a condition of sale being that the team remain in Ottawa.

Home rinks

Ottawa Civic Centre

The Senators' first home arena was the Ottawa Civic Centre (now TD Place Arena), located on Bank Street in Ottawa, where they played from the 1992–93 season to January of the 1995–96 season. The arena, used by the junior Ottawa 67's, was renovated for the Senators, including adding press boxes and luxury boxes. They played their first home game on October 8, 1992, against the Montreal Canadiens with much pre-game spectacle. The Senators would defeat the Canadiens 5–3. Their last game in the arena was on December 31, 1995, versus the Tampa Bay Lightning.

Canadian Tire Centre

As part of its bid to land an NHL franchise for Ottawa, Terrace Corporation unveiled the original proposal for the arena development at a press conference in September 1989. The site itself,  of farmland, on the western border of Kanata, had been acquired in May 1987 from farmer Cyril Bennett for  million, and flipped to Terrace for  million in 1989. Rezoning approval was granted by the Ontario Municipal Board on August 28, 1991, with conditions. The conditions imposed by the board included a scaling down of the arena to 18,500 seats, a moratorium on development outside the initial  arena site, and that the cost of the highway interchange with Highway 417 be paid by Terrace. A two-year period was spent seeking financing for the site and interchange by Terrace Corporation. The corporation received a  million grant from the Government of Canada but needed to borrow to pay for the rest of the costs of construction. A ground-breaking ceremony was held in June 1992 but actual construction did not start until July 7, 1994. Actual construction took 18 months, finishing in January 1996.

The Palladium opened on January 15, 1996, with a concert by Canadian rocker Bryan Adams. The Senators played their first game in their new arena two days later, falling 3–0 to the Montreal Canadiens. On February 17, 1996, the name 'Palladium' was changed to 'Corel Centre' when Corel Corporation, an Ottawa software company, signed a twenty-year deal for the naming rights.

When mortgage holder Covanta Energy (the former Ogden Entertainment) went into receivership in 2001, Terrace was expected to pay off its debt to Covanta in full. The ownership was not able to refinance the arena, eventually leading Terrace itself to declare bankruptcy in 2002. On August 26, 2003, billionaire businessman Eugene Melnyk finalized the purchase of the Senators and the arena. The arena and club became solely owned by Melnyk through a new company, Capital Sports & Entertainment.

In 2004, the ownership applied to expand its seating and the City of Ottawa amended its by-laws for the venue, increasing its seating capacity in 2005 to 19,153 and total attendance capacity to 20,500 including standing room.

On January 19, 2006, the arena became known as 'Scotiabank Place' after Melnyk reached a new 15-year naming agreement with Canadian bank Scotiabank on January 11, 2006, ending the 20-year contract with Corel. Scotiabank had been an advertising partner with the club for several years and a financial partner with owner Melnyk, and signed a  million over 15-years deal; a slight increase over Corel's contract. While Corel was no longer the arena name sponsor, it continued as an advertising sponsor.

In 2011, in time for the Senators hosting the NHL All-Star Game, the team installed a new video scoreboard, known as the 'Bell HD' screen, made by Panasonic.

On June 18, 2013, the Senators and Scotiabank ended the naming rights deal after seven years. The Ottawa Senators announced a marketing agreement with the Canadian Tire retail store chain, and as a result, the arena was renamed Canadian Tire Centre on July 1, 2013.

Downtown arena proposal

In 2015, the National Capital Commission (NCC) put out a request for proposals to redevelop the LeBreton Flats area in downtown Ottawa, a longtime vacant former industrial area. In 2016, the NCC settled on the proposal presented by Senators owner Eugene Melnyk and the RendezVous LeBreton Group partnership with Trinity Developments. The proposal included housing units, park space, a recreation facility, a library and a new arena for the Ottawa Senators.

The plan to build a new arena downtown came apart in late 2018 after it was revealed that the Senators were suing Trinity for  million in damages. Trinity was developing a site adjacent to the LeBreton Flats site and the Senators felt this was inappropriate competition. Trinity responded with a  billion lawsuit, accusing the Senators of being unwilling to contribute any money to the project. The NCC announced the cancellation of the partnership's bid to develop the site but gave the sides an extension when the two parties agreed to mediation. On February 27, 2019, it was announced that mediation between the parties had failed to come to an agreement and that the NCC would explore other options for the site's redevelopment.

The NCC resumed the process to redevelop the overall site, reserving the site of the arena and asking for preliminary bids on the arena site separately. After a February 2022 deadline to submit bids, the NCC announced that it had received several bids for the site. Local media speculated that the Senators were actively pursuing a bid, authorized by Melnyk shortly before his death. On June 23, 2022, the NCC announced that the Senators proposal had been chosen for the site, with a lease agreement expected to be put in place by autumn of 2023. In related business, the outstanding lawsuits around the previous LeBreton bid were settled out of court in December 2022.

Practice facility
The Senators practice facility is known as the Bell Sensplex, a  million joint venture with the City of Ottawa. Located southeast of the Canadian Tire Centre, the facility has three NHL-sized rinks, an Olympics-size rink and a fieldhouse that opened in 2004. It is used for Senators' practices, minor hockey and it is also the home of the annual minor hockey league Bell Capital Cup tournament.

Team identity
The Senators organization is located in a bilingual marketplace and operates in both English and French. Ottawa is officially bilingual, and the Ottawa-Gatineau census metropolitan area is a mix of anglophones and francophones. Longstanding Senators policy calls for providing services and marketing in both English and French to its bilingual fanbase. A bilingual version of the Canadian anthem is sung before home games and all announcements are in both languages. It has been estimated that 40 per cent of season ticket holders are francophone. Senators games are broadcast on both the English-language TSN and the French-language RDS networks, in a long-standing agreement with Bell Media.

Logo and jersey design

The team colours are black, red and white with gold trim. Except for the gold, the colours match the colours of the original Senators. The team's home jersey is black with red trim, while the away jersey is white with black and red trim. The club's logo is the head of a Roman general, a member of the Senate of the Roman Republic in a gold semi-circle. The original logo, unveiled on May 23, 1991, described the general as a "centurion figure, strong and prominent" according to its designer, Tony Milchard.

From 1992 to 1995, the Senators' primary road jerseys were black with red stripes. The numbers were red for the first season but switched to white afterwards. White stripes were added to the uniform in 1995. The white uniforms, which were worn on home games until 2003 and on road games until 2007, featured black sleeves and tail stripes with red accents, and black lettering. In 1997, the Senators unveiled a red third jersey. It featured the first iteration of the "forward-facing" centurion logo, designed by Kevin Caradonna, head of the team's graphic design department, who also designed the mascot "Spartacat". The jersey became the team's primary dark jersey starting in 1999. From 2000 to 2007, the Senators also wore a black alternate jersey with gold, red and white accents.

A new jersey design was unveiled on August 22, 2007, in conjunction with the league-wide adoption of the Rbk EDGE jerseys by Reebok for the 2007–08 season. The jersey incorporates the original Senators' 'O' logo as a shoulder patch. At the same time, the team updated its logos and switched its usage. The primary logo, which according to team owner Eugene Melnyk, "represents strength and determination" is an update of the old secondary logo.

Prior to the 2008–09 season, the Senators unveiled a new black third jersey, featuring the shortened "SENS" moniker in front. The centurion logo adorns the shoulders and the striping was inspired by the team's original black jerseys.

In 2011, the Senators introduced a throwback-inspired third jersey design. Mostly black, the jersey incorporated horizontal striping intended to be reminiscent of the original Senators' 'barber-pole' designs. Shield-type patches were added to the shoulders. The design of the shield-type patches was intended to be similar to the shield patches that the original Senators added to their jerseys after each Stanley Cup championship win. The patches spell the team name, one in English, and one in French. The design was a collaborative effort between the Senators and a fan in Gatineau, Quebec who had been circulating a version of it on the internet since 2009. The black third jerseys served as the basis of the Senators' 2014 Heritage Classic jerseys, which used cream as the base colour.

In 2017, the Senators' jerseys received a slight makeover when Adidas replaced Reebok as the NHL's uniform provider. The number font was changed to match those of their recent third jerseys, which were retired after the 2016–17 season. Prior to the 2018–19 season, the Senators brought back the red jerseys worn during the NHL 100 Classic as a third jersey. The design featured a silver "O" in front with black trim amid horizontal black, silver and white stripes.

In 2020, the Senators reintroduced its 1997–2007 logo with the jersey set used from 1992 to 1995. The updated logo uses a gold outline as opposed to red. The new uniforms, while largely resembling the originals from the 1990s, retained the lettering font used since the Adidas takeover, while the white uniforms retained only the black and red stripes along the upper arm sleeves. Both the home and away uniforms include a red band across the very bottom of the jerseys. In addition, the Senators unveiled a "Reverse Retro" alternate uniform; the design was of the original 1992–93 uniform but with red as the base colour. In the 2022–23 season, the Senators wore "Reverse Retro" uniforms based on the alternates they wore from 1997 to 2007, but with the current 2-D logo in front, black as the base colour and less white elements.

Arena entertainment

At many home games, the fans are entertained both outside and inside Canadian Tire Centre with myriad entertainers – live music, DJs, giveaways and promotions. The live music includes the traditional Scottish music of the 'Sons of Scotland Pipe Band' of Ottawa along with highland dancers. Before and during games, entertainment is hosted by Spartacat, the official mascot of the Senators, an anthropomorphic lion. He made his debut on the Senators' opening night: October 8, 1992. From 1994 until 2016, the national anthems were sung by former Ontario Provincial Police Constable Lyndon Slewidge. At home games, O Canada is traditionally sung in both English and French with the first half of the first stanza and chorus sung in English and the second half of the first stanza sung in French. The Senators have their own theme song titled Ottawa Senators Theme Song which is played as the team comes on the ice and is also used in Sens TV web videos. It was composed locally in Ottawa. The song is available in MP3 format at the nhl.com website at The team's goal horn is an Airchime M3H horn from a retired VIA Rail train. The team initially used it in the Civic Centre.

Attendance, revenue and ownership
On April 18, 2008, the club announced its final attendance figures for 2007–08. The club had 40 sell-outs out of 41 home dates, a total attendance of 812,665 during the regular season, placing the club third in attendance in the NHL. The number of sell-outs and the total attendance were both club records. The previous attendance records were set during the 2005–06 with a season total of 798,453 and 33 sell-outs. In the 2006–07 regular season, total attendance was 794,271, with 31 sell-outs out of 41 home dates or an average attendance of 19,372. In the 2007 playoffs, the Senators played nine games with nine sell-outs and an attendance of 181,272 for an average of 20,141, the highest in team history. Until recent seasons, the club was regularly represented in the top half in attendance in the NHL. In 2018–19, the Senators average attendance was 14,553, 27th in the league. Attendance dropped further in the 2019–20 season, dropping to an average of 12,618, the lowest in the league.

A December 2021 report by Forbes magazine valued the Senators at  million, or 28th in the league. Forbes estimated the debt/value ratio at 38% and that the team lost  million in 2020–21 on revenue of  million. Owned by the Estate of Eugene Melynk, Melnyk bought the team and arena for  million in 2003 out of bankruptcy. It was previously owned by Terrace Investments, majority owned by Rod Bryden, until it declared bankruptcy in 2002. Terrace Investments won the bid for an NHL franchise in 1990.

Sens Army

The fans of the Senators are known as the Sens Army. Like most hockey fanatics, they are known to dress up for games; some in Roman legionary clothing. For the 2006–2007 playoff run, more fans than ever before would wear red, and fan activities included 'Red Rallies' of decorated cars, fan rallies at Ottawa City Hall Plaza and the 'Sens Mile' along Elgin Street where fans would congregate.

Sens Mile
Much like the Red Mile in Calgary during the Flames' 2004 cup run and the Copper Kilometre in Edmonton during the Edmonton Oilers' 2006 cup run, Ottawa Senators fans took to the streets to celebrate their team's success during the 2007 playoffs. The idea to have a 'Sens Mile' on downtown Elgin Street, a street with numerous restaurants and pubs, began as a grassroots campaign on Facebook by Ottawa residents before game four of the Ottawa-Buffalo Eastern Conference Finals series. After the game five win, Ottawa residents closed the street to traffic for a spontaneous celebration. The City of Ottawa then closed Elgin Street for each game of the Final.

Broadcasting
Ottawa Senators games are broadcast locally in both the English and French languages. As of the 2014–15 season, regional television rights to the Senators' regular season games not broadcast nationally by Sportsnet, TVA Sports, or Hockey Night in Canada are owned by Bell Media under a 12-year contract, with games airing in English on TSN5, and in French on RDS. Regional broadcasts are available within the team's designated region (shared with the Montreal Canadiens), which includes the Ottawa River valley, Eastern Ontario (portions are shared with the Toronto Maple Leafs), along with Quebec, the Maritime provinces and Newfoundland and Labrador.

On radio, all home and away games are broadcast on a five-station network stretching across Eastern Ontario, including one American station, WQTK in Ogdensburg, New York. The flagship radio station is CFGO in Ottawa. Radio broadcasts on CFGO began in 1997–98; the contract has since been extended through the 2025–2026 as part of Bell Media's rights deal with the team. The Senators are broadcast on radio in French through Intersport Production and CJFO-FM in Ottawa. Nicolas St. Pierre provides play-by-play, with Alain Sanscartier as colour commentator.

Sportsnet East held English regional rights to the Sens prior to the 2014–15 season. In April 2014, Dean Brown, who had called play-by-play for Senators games since the team's inception, stated that it was "extremely unlikely" that he would move to TSN and continue his role. He noted that the network already had four commentators among its personalities – including Gord Miller, Chris Cuthbert, Rod Black, and Paul Romanuk (who was, however, picked up by Rogers for its national NHL coverage in June 2014), who were likely candidates to serve as the new voices of the Senators. Brown ultimately moved to the Senators' radio broadcasts alongside Gord Wilson. Both Miller and Cuthbert, along with Ray Ferraro and Jamie McLennan, became the Senators' TV voices on TSN from 2014 to 2020. After Cuthbert joined Sportsnet in 2020, former Canucks radio voice Jon Abbott took over as the secondary play-by-play commentator in games where Miller is assigned to call the Maple Leafs. Mike Johnson, who concurrently works colour commentary for the Canadiens and Maple Leafs on TSN, replaced Ferraro as an alternate to McLennan.

During the 2006–07 and 2007–08 seasons, several games were only available in video on pay-per-view or at local movie theatres in the Ottawa area. The "Sens TV" service was suspended indefinitely as of September 24, 2008. In 2010, Sportsnet launched a secondary channel for selected Senators games as part of its Sportsnet One service. Selected broadcasts of Senators games in the French language were broadcast by RDS and TVA Sports. On the RDS network, Félix Séguin and former Senators goaltender Patrick Lalime were the announcers from the 2011–12 season to the 2013–14 season, and Michel Y. Lacroix and Norman Flynn starting in the 2014–15 season. The TVA Sports broadcast team consisted of Michel Langevin, Yvon Pedneault and Enrico Ciccone.

Players and personnel

Current roster

Team captains

Laurie Boschman, 1992–1993
Mark Lamb and Brad Shaw, 1993–1994 (co-captains)
Gord Dineen, 1994
Randy Cunneyworth, 1995–1998
Alexei Yashin, 1998–1999
Daniel Alfredsson, 1999–2013
Jason Spezza, 2013–2014
Erik Karlsson, 2014–2018
Brady Tkachuk, 2021–present

Head coaches

Statistics are accurate through the hiring of D.J. Smith.

General managers

Source: Ottawa Senators 2009–10 Media Guide, p. 206.

Honoured members

Hall of Famers
 Roger Neilson – Senators' assistant coach and head coach (2001–2003) was inducted (as a Builder) on November 4, 2002, for his career in coaching.
 Dominik Hasek – Senators' goaltender (2005–2006) was inducted in 2014 for his career as a goalie.
 Marian Hossa – Senators' winger (1998–2004) was inducted in 2020 (ceremony held in 2021) for his career as a forward.
 Daniel Alfredsson – Senators winger (1995–2013) was inducted in 2022 for his career as a forward.

Retired numbers

 1 Finnigan was honoured for his play from 1923 through 1934 for the original Ottawa Senators (playing right wing, 1923–1931 and 1932–1934). He was the last surviving Senator from the Stanley Cup winners of 1927 and participated in the 'Bring Back the Senators' campaign.
 The NHL retired Wayne Gretzky's No. 99 for all its member teams at the 2000 NHL All-Star Game.

Ring of Honour
Bryan Murray – Senators' head coach (2005–2008) and general manager (2007–2016).
Wade Redden – Senators' defenceman (1996–2008) and alternate captain (1999–2008).

All-time players

Team record

Season-by-season record
This is a partial list of the last five seasons completed by the Senators. For the full season-by-season history, see List of Ottawa Senators seasons

Note: GP = Games Played, W = Wins, L = Losses, T = Ties, OTL = Overtime Losses, Pts = Points, GF = Goals for, GA = Goals against, PIM = Penalties in minutes

Team scoring leaders
These are the top-ten regular season point-scorers in franchise history. Figures are updated after each completed NHL regular season.

Note: Pos = Position; GP = Games played; G = Goals; A = Assists; Pts = Points; P/G = Points per game average;

Source: Ottawa Senators Media Guide

NHL awards and trophies

Prince of Wales Trophy
2006–07

Presidents' Trophy
2002–03

Calder Memorial Trophy
Daniel Alfredsson: 1995–96

NHL Plus-Minus Award
Wade Redden: 2005–06 (shared with Michal Rozsival of the New York Rangers)

Jack Adams Award
Jacques Martin: 1998–99
Paul MacLean: 2012–13
James Norris Memorial Trophy
 Erik Karlsson: 2011–12, 2014–15

King Clancy Memorial Trophy
Daniel Alfredsson: 2011–12

Mark Messier Leadership Award
Daniel Alfredsson: 2012–13

Bill Masterton Memorial Trophy
Craig Anderson: 2016–17
Bobby Ryan: 2019–20

NHL All-Rookie Team
Daniel Alfredsson: 1995–96
Sami Salo: 1998–99
Marian Hossa: 1998–99
Martin Havlat: 2000–01
Andrej Meszaros: 2005–06
Mark Stone: 2014–15
Brady Tkachuk: 2018–19 
Josh Norris: 2020–21

NHL first All-Star team
Zdeno Chara: 2003–04
Dany Heatley: 2006–07
Erik Karlsson: 2011–12, 2014–15, 2015–16, 2016–17

NHL second All-Star team
Alexei Yashin: 1998–99
Dany Heatley: 2005–06
Daniel Alfredsson: 2005–06
Zdeno Chara: 2005–06

Team records

Source: Ottawa Senators.

See also
 Bell Sensplex
 List of Ottawa Senators draft picks
 List of NHL players
 List of NHL seasons
 List of ice hockey teams in Ontario
 Lyndon Slewidge

Notes

Footnotes

Citations

References

External links

 
 Ottawa Senators Community Foundation

 
National Hockey League teams
1992 establishments in Ontario
Atlantic Division (NHL)
Ice hockey clubs established in 1992
Sen
National Hockey League in Ontario
National Hockey League teams based in Canada
Companies that filed for Chapter 11 bankruptcy in 2003